"Lucky You" is a song by American rapper Eminem featuring fellow American rapper Joyner Lucas. It was sent to UK contemporary hit radio on November 30, 2018, as the third single from Eminem's album Kamikaze. "Lucky You" was nominated for the Best Rap Song Grammy Award at the 61st annual awards ceremony. The single also reached the top 10 in Australia, Canada, Finland, Greece, Ireland, New Zealand, Norway, Portugal, Sweden, Switzerland, United Kingdom, and United States.

Music video
On September 10, 2018, Eminem teased on his Instagram that a music video for the song would be released on September 12. The teaser included multiple men in black sweatshirts falling from the sky onto a dirt ground. The video was not released on September 12, leading Eminem to later post another trailer for the music video, saying it would be released on the next day instead.

The official audio, was released on 31 August, 2018, the audio extand the 100 Million Views in 10 December 2020.

The official video, directed by James Larese, was released on September 13, 2018. In the video, it follows Eminem and Lucas in combat vests and pants strolling throughout the ruins of a city. It includes wrecked cars and abandoned buildings. Throughout the video, multiple hooded men with black sweatshirts appear to be "copying" whatever the rappers are doing. This is supposed to be a shot at the new generation of rappers copying what the bigger artists are doing. One scene includes them performing random dances, which the hooded men copied. In the middle of Eminem's verse, a gunshot from the original track goes off, sending the hooded men into the sky. The video ends with the two rappers walking away from the swarm.

Awards and nominations

Track listing
Digital Download

Personnel
Eminem - lead vocals, production, mixing
Joyner Lucas - vocals
Boi-1da - production 
Illa Da Producer - production
Jahaan Sweet - production
Brian "Nox Beatz" Eisner - additional mixing/recording/arrangement
Dr. Dre - executive production

Charts

Weekly charts

Year-end charts

Certifications

Release history

References

2018 songs
2018 singles
Songs written by Eminem
Song recordings produced by Boi-1da
Eminem songs
Joyner Lucas songs
Songs written by Joyner Lucas